The Château des Baux is a fortified castle built during the 10th century, located in Les Baux-de-Provence, Bouches-du-Rhône, southern France.

History 
Although already inhabited in the Bronze Age, Les Baux-de-Provence did not really start growing until the medieval period. Built in the 10th century, the fortress and the small town it protects were ruled by the lords of Baux for five hundred years, in the thick of the ceaseless conflicts that ravaged Provence. 
It was also at Les Baux that the most famous minstrels and troubadours of the day sang songs of courtly love to the maidens of the House of Les Baux.
In the 15th century, the lords of Baux were superseded by the barons of the Masons des Comtes de Provence. This was a golden age for the Château, before it came under the control of the kings of France.

From the 16th century on, family feuds and wars of religion brought on the decline of the town until the fortress was pulled down in 1633 on the orders of Louis XIII.

The Château des Baux today
Visitors to the Château des Baux can see full-scale replicas of huge siege engines, including a couillard, bricole, ballista, and the biggest trebuchet in Europe, which is launched during demonstrations several times daily between April and September.

External links

 Official website of the castle
 City council website

Ruined castles in Provence-Alpes-Côte d'Azur
Bouches-du-Rhône
Museums in Bouches-du-Rhône
Military and war museums in France
Historic house museums in Provence-Alpes-Côte d'Azur